Van Kirk Farm is a historic farm in Elizabeth Township, Allegheny County, Pennsylvania.  The fairly simple frame farmhouse was built c. 1840 in the Greek Revival style.  Several other buildings on the farm were built in the mid or late 19th century.

It was listed on the National Register of Historic Places on February 19, 1986. The farm is adjacent to the Hutchinson Farm, which is also listed on the National Register.

In "John Chapman, Johnny Appleseed, By occupation a gatherer," according to Mary Grace Hodges, as told to her by her grandmother, Johnny Appleseed (Johnny Chapman) gathered apple seeds from the Van Kirk cider mill.

References

Buildings and structures in Allegheny County, Pennsylvania
Farms on the National Register of Historic Places in Pennsylvania
Historic districts on the National Register of Historic Places in Pennsylvania
National Register of Historic Places in Allegheny County, Pennsylvania